Parvathipuram is a municipality located at Parvathipuram Manyam district of Indian state of Andhra Pradesh. It is the administrative  headquarters of Parvathipuram Manyam district and headquarters of Parvathipuram revenue division and Parvathipuram mandal. This revenue division shares a border with various districts in Odisha.

Geography
Parvathipuram is located at 18°46'N 83°25'E.  It has an average elevation of 120 meters (393.7 feet).

Demographics

 census, Parvathipuram had a population of 53,844. The total population constitute, 26,811 males and 27,033 females a sex ratio of 1008 females per 1000 males. 5,048 children are in the age group of 0–6 years, of which 2,607 are boys and 2,441 are girls a ratio of 936 per 1000. The average literacy rate stands at 79.14% with 38,618 literates, significantly higher than the state average of 67.41%.

Government and politics 

Parvathipuram is represented by Parvathipuram (SC) (Assembly constituency) for Andhra Pradesh Legislative Assembly and Araku (Lok Sabha constituency). Alajangi jogarao is the present MLA of the constituency representing ysr congress Party.

Transport

Train Transport

Parvathipuram is on the Jharsuguda–Vizianagaram line. There are two railway stations Parvathipuram and Parvathipuram Town within .
Station Codes
Parvathipuram railway station - (PVP)
Parvathipuram Town railway station - (PVPT)

Road Transport

There is Road connectivity between Major towns of Andhra pradesh and Odisha to Parvathipuram.
APSRTC is Providing Daily Bus facility to Vijayawada and other major cities Visakhapatnam, Vizianagaram, Rajahmundry, Srikakulam, Kakinada of Andhrapradesh and Various Places of Odisha.

Air Transport
The Nearest Airport is located in Visakhapatnam which is 150 km away from Parvathipuram.

Tourism Attractions
Parvathipuram has many tourist attractions are around and inside the town.

Devotional

Many Temples are Located around Parvathipuram area Kasi Viswanath temple Addapusila is the oldest historic temple which is located 5 km away from Parvathipuram town.

Sri Venkateswara Swamy Temple, Thotapalli is most popularly known as Chinna Tirupathi is famous for Lord Balaji; many pilgrims visit this temple from various states.

St. Paul's Lutheran Church is one of the oldest church in Parvathipuram area which was built in 1888. It is located at Main road Belagam and also a Roman Catholic church is also another attraction in this area.

Dams and Reservoirs

Janjavathi Rubber Dam/VKM Rubber Dam is located 15 km away from Parvathipuram which is Asia's first rubber dam. The dam is the first one to be completed as part of the ambitious Jalayagnam launched by the Government of Andhrapradesh in 2006.
Thotapalli reservoir is the largest dam in Parvathipuram revenue division which was built on Nagavali River. This project is the brain child of Chandra Babu Naidu. He laid foundation as CM in 2003 and completed the project as a CM in 2015. Thotapalli Reservoir area is mostly attracting for sightseeing and boating.

Entertainment

Cinemas 
Soundharya 
Padma sri picture palace 
TBR Cinemas

Parks
Dr Sanyasi Raju Municipal Park, Church street
Jurassic Children Park, Police Quarters
Railway Park, Belagam
ITDA Park, Thotapalli

Agriculture
Parvathipuram is agriculture based area here mainly cultivating paddy, cashew nuts, mangoes, mahua and other minor crops. Farmers in this area are mainly depending on Janjavathi Rubber Dam and Thotapalli Reservoir for agriculture. Thotapalli Reservoir is also supplying drinking water to Parvathipuram town.

Climate

Education
Parvathipuram is a Major Educational Hub for Surrounding Mandals and villages. Here are Many Private, public schools and Junior&Degree colleges are Located. 
Colleges: 
DR. YSR Horticultural University, College of Horticulture]], Parvathipuram
Sri Venkateswara Degree college, Parvathipuram
Gayatri Degree college                          
Janahita Degree College
Government Polytechnic College, Mr nagaram 
Shirdhi Sai Polytechnic College
APTWR Jr College of Excellence, Parvathipuram
Bhaskar Junior College
DBK Arts & Sci Jr College, Sunki
Government junior college, Parvathipuram
Sri Sa Iram Jr College
Vasavi junior College
Schools:
Pratibha Excellence school, Parvathipuram
DVMM School, Parvathipuram
Lions Eng. Medium school, Parvathipuram
Kavirayani Public School, Parvathipuram
St. Peters English Medium School, Parvathipuram
R.C.M. St Johns boys high school, Parvathipuram
R.C.M St Josephs Girls High School, Parvatipuram
Surya teja public school, Parvathipuram
Suresh Public school, Parvathipuram
Noble Public school, Parvathipuram
Bhaskar high School, Parvathipuram
Janahita Public school, Parvathipuram
sridhar public school, Parvathipuram
Viswa Vignana Vidyalayam, Parvathipuram
Ravindra Bharathi School, Parvathipuram
Narayana E Techno School, Parvathipuram
 Bharatha Maata High School, Parvathipuram
Aditya Public School, Parvathipuram
Sri Krishna Public School, Parvathipuram
K.P.M High school Kothavalasa parvathipuram

Notable people

 Ganesh Patro, Telugu cinema

Cityscape

See also 
List of municipalities in Andhra Pradesh

References 

Parvathipuram Manyam district